In computer programming, a function prototype or function interface is a declaration of a function that specifies the function’s name and type signature (arity, data types of parameters, and return type), but omits the function body. While a function definition specifies how the function does what it does (the "implementation"), a function prototype merely specifies its interface, i.e. what data types go in and come out of it. The term "function prototype" is particularly used in the context of the programming languages C and C++ where placing forward declarations of functions in header files allows for splitting a program into translation units, i.e. into parts that a compiler can separately translate into object files, to be combined by a linker into an executable or a library.

In a prototype, parameter names are optional (and in C/C++ have function prototype scope, meaning their scope ends at the end of the prototype), however, the type is necessary along with all modifiers (e.g. if it is a pointer or a reference to  parameter) except  alone.

In object-oriented programming, interfaces and abstract methods serve much the same purpose.

Example 
Consider the following function prototype:

void Sum( int a, int b );

OR

void Sum( int, int );

Function prototypes include the function signature, the name of the function, return type and access specifier. In this case the name of the function is "Sum". The function signature defines the number of parameters and their types. The return type is "void". This means that the function is not going to return any value. Note that the parameter names in the first example are optional.

Uses 
In early versions of C, if a function was not previously declared and its name occurred in an expression followed by a left parenthesis, it was implicitly declared as a function that returns an int and nothing was assumed about its arguments. In this case the compiler would not be able to perform compile-time validity checking of the number and type(s) of arguments. 
The C99 standard requires the use of prototypes.

char MyFunction ( int a ); /* Function prototype */

#include <stdio.h>
#include <limits.h> 
int main( void ) 
{   

  putchar( MyFunction( -1 ) );   /* Correctly formatted call */

  putchar( MyFunction( 1.5 ) );  /* Compiler generates a warning because of type mismatch */

  putchar( MyFunction("IncorrectArgType") ); /* Compiler will generate a warning */

  putchar( MyFunction() );     /* Compiler will generate an Error too few arguments */
  
  int one=1;
  putchar( MyFunction( INT_MAX + one ) ); /* Although adding 1 to the maximum integer 
                                        /* is an error it cannot be detected at compile time */

  return 0;
}

char MyFunction( int n )  /* Function definition */
{
  if (n > 0)   return '>';
  if (n < 0)   return '<'; 
  return '=';
}

The function  expects to be called with an integer argument.  By including the function prototype, you inform the compiler that the function takes one integer argument and you enable the compiler to catch incorrectly specified calls.

Creating library interfaces 
By placing function prototypes in a header file, one can specify an interface for a library.

Class declaration 
In C++, function prototypes are also used in class definitions.

See also 
 Modular programming
 Protocol (object-oriented programming)
 Abstract method

References 

 

Subroutines
C programming language family
Computer programming